William Parkinson may refer to:

William Parkinson (footballer)
William Lynn Parkinson, United States federal judge
William Parkinson (chaplain)

See also
William Parkinson Ruxton, Irish Member of Parliament